Yu-Gi-Oh! Sevens is the seventh main anime series in the Yu-Gi-Oh! franchise and the tenth anime series overall. It is produced by Bridge and broadcast on TV Tokyo. The series is directed by Nobuhiro Kondo. The series follows Yūga and his friends as they show off the delights of Rush Duels while under the watchful eye of the Goha Corporation that oversees the city. On April 28, 2020, it was announced that after episode 5, the remaining episodes would be delayed for five weeks due to the effects of the COVID-19 pandemic. On July 10, 2020, it was announced it will be delayed again due to the aforementioned pandemic and will resume on August 8, 2020. Starting April 4, 2021, it airs on Sunday at 7:30 AM JST.

An English dub of Sevens began production in early 2021. In May 2022, it was announced that the English dub would premiere in the United States on Disney XD on June 6 and Hulu on June 7, 2022.

The series uses four pieces of theme music: two opening themes and two ending themes.

Series overview

Episode list

Season 1 (2020–21)

Season 2 (2021–22)

Notes

References

Sevens
Yu-Gi-Oh! Sevens